St. John Paul II School is a private, co-educational, Roman Catholic high school in Hyannis, Massachusetts serving students from Grade 5 to 12. It is located in the Roman Catholic Diocese of Fall River and maintains an enrollment of 450-500 students from Cape Cod, Canal Region, and South Shore area. The school’s academic, artistic, athletic, and co-curricular programs cultivate strong relationships and empower students to recognize their gifts, develop their potential, and communicate Christ in word and deed. Emulating their patron St. John Paul II, students pursue truth through faith and reason, preparing them to lead lives of continuous learning, respect, and community leadership. The School opens its doors for all persons regardless of religious affiliation.

Background
Operated by the Diocese of Fall River, St. John Paul II High School opened in 2007 (as Pope John Paul II High School) to serve the residents of Cape Cod, Massachusetts. In June 2013, the Diocese unified St. John Paul II High School with St. Francis Xavier Preparatory School (grades 5–8). The schools are located across the parking lot from each other. They operate as a 5–12 school with separate campuses for middle school and high school. Following the April 2014 canonization of St. John Paul II, Fall River Diocesan Bishop Edgar M. da Cunha, announced on December 8, 2014 that Pope John Paul II High School would now be called St. John Paul II High School.

St. John Paul II High School is located in the old Barnstable High School building in downtown Hyannis, off of Main Street. The school has a 500-seat auditorium for stage productions and assemblies.

Major renovations such as a fitness center, full-length lockers, classroom redecoration, new locker rooms, a new chemistry lab, and an iMac graphics design lab were all part of the restoration.

The school is open to not only families of the Catholic faith, but followers of all religions.

The New England Association of Schools & Colleges (NEASC) granted the school a maximum 10-year accreditation in December 2010.

One Crazy Summer a 1986 romantic comedy film written and directed by Savage Steve Holland was filmed at this school, which was renamed Generic High School for the opening graduation scene 

In 2021, the school unified St. John Paul II High School (Gr. 9-12) and St. Francis Xavier Preparatory School (Gr. 5-8) and operate as one entity under a new name: St. John Paul II School. Currently, 251 students are enrolled in grades 9-12. The school graduated its first senior class (27 students) in June 2011 with 100% of the class accepted to college. Since its inception, the school, has a 100% college acceptance rate.

Academic Programs 
St. John Paul II School offers a challenging college-preparatory curriculum, including College Preparatory, Honors, and Advanced Placement courses. In recent years, JPII offered AP English, AP Calculus AB, AP Biology, AP Chemistry, AP Physics, AP Environmental Science, AP U.S. History, AP Psychology, AP U.S. Government, AP Computer Science Principles, and AP Statistics. It also offers signature AP Capstone program which includes a full sequence of AP Research and AP Capstone. Every year, SPII graduates Advanced Placement Scholars who are well positioned for a challenging academic curriculum.

Athletics & co-Curricular Activities
St. John Paul II High School is a member of the MIAA and has 18 interscholastic sport teams competing at the varsity level. The majority of teams compete in the Cape & Islands League. The football team competes in the Catholic Central Small conference. The other members of the Catholic Central Small are Cathedral High School, Lowell Catholic High School, Trinity Catholic High School, Marian High School, Pope John XXIII High School, St. Clement High School, and Matignon High School.

Baseball
The baseball team has developed into a small-school powerhouse in Massachusetts and is consistently ranked in the state Top 25 polls. They have won four Catholic Central Small League Championships (2013, 2014, 2015, 2016), won four consecutive Division 4 South Sectional titles, and made four straight appearances in the Division 4 State Finals, winning three of those matches to claim three consecutive state championships (2014, 2015, 2016).

In 2013, the baseball team won the Division 4 South Sectional championship for the first time. They advanced to the Division 4 State Finals, where they were defeated by Lowell Catholic.

In 2014, the baseball team once again won the Division 4 South Sectional championship for the second straight year. They ultimately won the Division 4 State Championship, defeating Hopkins by a score of 3-0. This was first state championship in SJP's history. They play their home games at McKeon Park located behind the school, which is also the home of the Hyannis Harbor Hawks of the Cape Cod Baseball League.

In 2015, the baseball team won the Division 4 South Sectional championship for the third year in a row. The Lions eventually won the Division 4 State Championship for the second consecutive year, defeating Smith Academy by a score of 8-6, and in the process, completed the season with an undefeated 26-0 record.

In 2016, the baseball team once again won the Division 4 South Sectional Championship for the fourth consecutive year. They also advanced to the Division 4 State Finals, where they defeated Oxford by a score of 8-7 to claim their third consecutive state championship. The Lions finished the season with a 25-1 overall record.

Football
In 2014, the football team won Catholic Central Small championship for the first time. Behind the leadership of All-State quarterback Ryan Barabe, the Lion's football team completed an undefeated regular season in 2014 and were the #1 ranked team in Division 6 and were ranked as high as #20 in the state. The Lions qualified for the state playoffs and were the #1 ranked team in Division 6 South. After winning their first round match-up, the Lions were upset by a powerful Millis-Hopedale team. The Lions finished their historic season with an 8-3 record.

Hockey
In the 2017–18 season, The Lions hockey team finished with the best season in program history, finishing the regular season 16-4, 2nd in the Catholic Central League, and earned the #4 seed in the MIAA Men's Ice Hockey Tournament. Led by senior all-stars Jimmy Manning, Billy Dwyer, and Corey Weeks, as well as goalie Henry Klimm, the Lions concluded their season with a 1-0 win over powerhouse Bishop Stang. Despite the regular season success, the Lions were upset by Ashland High School in the MIAA tournament.

References

External links
 

Buildings and structures in Barnstable, Massachusetts
Educational institutions established in 2007
Catholic secondary schools in Massachusetts
Schools in Barnstable County, Massachusetts
2007 establishments in Massachusetts